The Black model (sometimes known as the Black-76 model) is a variant of the Black–Scholes option pricing model. Its primary applications are for pricing options on future contracts, bond options, interest rate cap and floors, and swaptions. It was first presented in a paper written by Fischer Black in 1976.

Black's model can be generalized into a class of models known as log-normal forward models, also referred to as LIBOR market model.

The Black formula
The Black formula is similar to the Black–Scholes formula for valuing stock options except that the spot price of the underlying is replaced by a discounted futures price F.

Suppose there is constant risk-free interest rate r and the futures price F(t) of a particular underlying is log-normal with constant volatility σ. Then the Black formula states the price for a European call option of maturity T on a futures contract with strike price K and delivery date T (with ) is

The corresponding put price is

where

and N(.) is the cumulative normal distribution function.

Note that T' doesn't appear in the formulae even though it could be greater than T. This is because futures contracts are marked to market and so the payoff is realized when the option is exercised. If we consider an option on a forward contract expiring at time T' > T, the payoff doesn't occur until T' . Thus the discount factor  is replaced by  since one must take into account the time value of money. The difference in the two cases is clear from the derivation below.

Derivation and assumptions
The Black formula is easily derived from the use of Margrabe's formula, which in turn is a simple, but clever, application of the Black–Scholes formula.

We can consider this an exchange (Margrabe) option by considering the first asset to be  and the second asset to be the riskless bond paying off $1 at time . Then the call option is exercised at time  when the first asset is worth more than  riskless bonds. The assumptions of Margrabe's formula are satisfied with these assets.

The only remaining thing to check is that the first asset is indeed an asset. This can be seen by considering a portfolio formed at time 0 by going long a forward contract with delivery date  and long  riskless bonds (note that under the deterministic interest rate, the forward and futures prices are equal so there is no ambiguity here). Then at any time  you can unwind your obligation for the forward contract by shorting another forward with the same delivery date to get the difference in forward prices, but discounted to present value: .

See also
 Financial mathematics
 Black–Scholes
 Description of applications
Bond option #Valuation
Futures contract #Options on futures
Interest rate cap and floor #Black model
Swaption #Valuation

References
 Black, Fischer (1976). The pricing of commodity contracts, Journal of Financial Economics, 3, 167-179.
 Garman, Mark B. and Steven W. Kohlhagen (1983). Foreign currency option values, Journal of International Money and Finance, 2, 231-237.
 Miltersen, K., Sandmann, K. et Sondermann, D., (1997): "Closed Form Solutions for Term Structure Derivates with Log-Normal Interest Rates", Journal of Finance, 52(1), 409-430.

External linksDiscussion Bond Options, Caps and the Black Model Dr. Milica Cudina, University of Texas at AustinOnline tools'
 Caplet And Floorlet Calculator Dr. Shing Hing Man, Thomson-Reuters' Risk Management

Options (finance)
Financial models